Peter Short (27 October 1944 – 22 February 1984) was an English professional footballer who played as a defender and a forward. Active in the United States and Canada, Short made over 150 appearances in a career lasting 11 seasons.

Career
Born in Liverpool, Short played professionally in the United States and Canada for the Philadelphia Spartans, the Cleveland Stokers, the Dallas Tornado, the Rochester Lancers, the Denver Dynamos, the Vancouver Whitecaps and the Minnesota Kicks. In 1966, he played in the Eastern Canada Professional Soccer League with Toronto Italia Falcons. After the conclusion of the ECPSL season he played in the American Soccer League with Newark Ukrainian Sitch. Short scored the first goal in the first game of the National Professional Soccer League, held on 16 April 1967.

Short was shot in the chest and killed during an attempted robbery at his cloth cutting business near the Coliseum in Los Angeles in 1984.

Awards and honors
Short was an NASL first team All-Star in 1971 and 1972. He was also named to the All-Tournament team of the NASL's first indoor tournament in 1971. In 1977, he was named to the Rochester Lancers Team of the Decade. On 27 December 2014, the Rochester Lancers of the Major Arena Soccer League will induct Short into the Rochester Lancers Wall of Fame as one of Rochester's "soccer pioneers". Short played for the original Rochester Lancers of the North American Soccer League.

References

1944 births
1984 deaths
English footballers
English expatriate footballers
Expatriate soccer players in the United States
Expatriate soccer players in Canada
English expatriate sportspeople in the United States
English expatriate sportspeople in Canada
Newark Ukrainian Sitch players
Toronto Italia players
Philadelphia Spartans players
Cleveland Stokers players
Dallas Tornado players
Rochester Lancers (1967–1980) players
Denver Dynamos players
Vancouver Whitecaps (1974–1984) players
Minnesota Kicks players
National Professional Soccer League (1967) players
North American Soccer League (1968–1984) players
North American Soccer League (1968–1984) indoor players
Association football defenders
Association football forwards
Deaths by firearm in California
Eastern Canada Professional Soccer League players
American Soccer League (1933–1983) players